Emily Jean Perkins (born May 4, 1977) is a Canadian former actress, best known for her roles as Crystal Braywood in the TV series Hiccups, young Beverly Marsh in Stephen King's It, and Brigitte Fitzgerald in Ginger Snaps. Since the late 1980s she has appeared in various films and television series.

Early life and career
Perkins was born in Vancouver, British Columbia. As a child actress she was in three made-for-television films: Small Sacrifices, Anything to Survive, and Stephen King's It.

In 1998, Perkins took a supporting role in the Canadian TV crime-drama series Da Vinci's Inquest as Carmen in the episode "The Most Dangerous Time". She returned to the series in 2001 to take a recurring, supporting role as the prostitute Sue Lewis for a further 34 episodes, a role which earned her a Leo Award for Best Supporting Performance in 2003.

In 2000, Perkins starred in the film Ginger Snaps as Brigitte Fitzgerald opposite of Katharine Isabelle as Ginger Fitzgerald. In 2004, she starred in two back-to-back films, a sequel titled Ginger Snaps 2: Unleashed, and a prequel titled Ginger Snaps Back: The Beginning. Her role in Ginger Snaps gained her Best Actress award at the Málaga International Week of Fantastic Cinema in 2001. Ginger Snaps 2: Unleashed is Perkins' largest role in a film.  In 2004 the horror magazine Fangoria awarded Perkins their Chainsaw Award for her work in GS2: Unleashed.

Perkins had supporting roles in She's the Man, Another Cinderella Story (where she reunited with Isabelle), and a small role as a receptionist in Juno. She stars in the thriller Blood: A Butcher's Tale.

In 2009 and 2011, she appeared as "superfan" Becky Rosen in the CW TV series Supernatural. She reprised her role in 2019 for the 15th and final season of the show.

Starting in March 2010, Perkins played the regular role of Crystal Braywood in the Canadian TV comedy series Hiccups. After two seasons the show was cancelled.

Her father is Sicilian and her mother is of Belgian ancestry. She is married to Belgian Canadian academic Ernest Mathijs, who has written about cult films, including her roles in the Ginger Snaps series.

Filmography

Film

Television

Awards and nominations

References

External links
 

1977 births
Living people
20th-century Canadian actresses
21st-century Canadian actresses
Actresses from Vancouver
Canadian child actresses
Canadian film actresses
Canadian television actresses
Canadian voice actresses
University of British Columbia alumni